Catán Lil is a department located in the center of Neuquén Province, Argentina.

Geography
The Department limits with Picunches Department at north, Zapala Department at northeast, Picún Leufú Department at east, Collón Curá Department at southeast, Huiliches Department at southwest and Aluminé Department at northwest.

Departments of Neuquén Province